Ozerkovka is a rural locality (a village) in Naumovsky Selsoviet, Sterlitamaksky District, Bashkortostan, Russia. The population was 28 as of 2010. There is 1 street.

Geography 
Ozerkovka is located 28 km south of Sterlitamak (the district's administrative centre) by road. Ayuchevo is the nearest rural locality.

References 

Rural localities in Sterlitamaksky District